The 1910 Texas A&M Aggies football team represented the Agricultural and Mechanical College of Texas—now known as Texas A&M University—as in independent  during the 1910 college football season. Led by second-year head coach Charley Moran, the Aggies finished the season with a record of 8–1.

Schedule

References

Texas AandM
Texas A&M Aggies football seasons
Texas AandM